Peter Assmann (born 28 August 1963 in Austria) is an Austrian writer and visual artist.

He studied art history and German literature. He is the current director of Austrian National Museum, president of the Austrian Museum Association and a member of the Network of European Museum Organisations.

Works
Obsessions, Bibliothek der Provinz, Weitra 2006
Bereits Bemerktes, Arovell Verlag, Gosau 2006
Der Maler Aloys Wach, G.-M. Bock, Frankfurt am Main 2007
Karl Hauk, Bibliothek der Provinz, Weitra 2008
Orte, dabei, Arovell Verlag, Gosau 2011

References

External links 
 
  Website
www.kulturhaus-bruckmuehle.at
 

1963 births
Living people
Austrian male writers